Haloarchaea (halophilic archaea, halophilic archaebacteria, halobacteria) are a class of the Euryarchaeota, found in water saturated or nearly saturated with salt. Halobacteria are now recognized as archaea rather than bacteria and are one of the largest groups. The name 'halobacteria' was assigned to this group of organisms before the existence of the domain Archaea was realized, and while valid according to taxonomic rules, should be updated. Halophilic archaea are generally referred to as haloarchaea to distinguish them from halophilic bacteria.

These microorganisms are among the halophile organisms, that they require high salt concentrations to grow, with most species requiring more than 2.0M NaCl for growth and survival. They are a distinct evolutionary branch of the Archaea distinguished by the possession of ether-linked lipids and the absence of murein in their cell walls.

Haloarchaea can grow aerobically or anaerobically. Parts of the membranes of haloarchaea are purplish in color, and large blooms of haloarchaea appear reddish, from the pigment bacteriorhodopsin, related to the retinal pigment rhodopsin, which it uses to transform light energy into chemical energy by a process unrelated to chlorophyll-based photosynthesis.

Haloarchaea have a potential to solubilize phosphorus. Phosphorus-solubilizing halophilic archaea may well play a role in P (phosphorus) nutrition to vegetation growing in hypersaline soils. Haloarchaea may also have applications as inoculants for crops growing in hypersaline regions.

Taxonomy
The extremely halophilic, aerobic members of Archaea are classified within the family Halobacteriaceae, order Halobacteriales in Class III. Halobacteria of the phylum Euryarchaeota (International Committee on Systematics of Prokaryotes, Subcommittee on the taxonomy of Halobacteriaceae). As of May 2016, the family Halobacteriaceae comprises 213 species in 50 genera.

Gupta et al. divides the class of Halobacteria in three orders.
 Halobacteriales Grant and Larsen 1989
 Haloarculaceae Gupta et al. 2016, 10 genera
 Halobacteriaceae Gibbons 1974, 24 genera
 Halococcaceae Gupta et al. 2016, 1 genus
 Haloferacales Gupta et al. 2015
 Haloferacaceae Gupta et al. 2015, 10 genera
 Halorubraceae Gupta et al. 2016, 9 genera
 Natrialbales Gupta et al. 2015
 Natrialbaceae Gupta et al. 2015, 18 genera

Phylogeny
The currently accepted taxonomy is based on the List of Prokaryotic names with Standing in Nomenclature (LPSN) and National Center for Biotechnology Information (NCBI).

Note: * paraphyletic Halobacteriaceae

Molecular signatures 
Detailed phylogenetic and comparative analyses of genome sequences from members of the class Haloarchaea has led to division of this class into three orders, Halobacteriales, Haloferacales and Natrialbales, which can be reliably distinguished from each other as well as all other archaea/bacteria through molecular signatures known as conserved signature indels. These studies have also identified 68 conserved signature proteins (CSPs) whose homologs are only found in the members of these three orders and 13 conserved signature indels (CSIs) in different proteins that are uniquely present in the members of the class Haloarchaea. These CSIs are present in the following proteins: DNA topoisomerase VI, nucleotide sugar dehydrogenase, ribosomal protein L10e, RecJ-like exonuclease, ribosomal protein S15, adenylosuccinate synthase, phosphopyruvate hydratase, RNA-associated protein, threonine synthase, aspartate aminotransferase, precorrin-8x methylmutase, protoporphyrin IX magnesium chelatase and geranylgeranylglyceryl phosphate synthase-like protein.

Living environment

Haloarchaea require salt concentrations in excess of 2 mol/L (or about 10%, three times the ocean salinity which is around 35g/L salt – 3.5%) in the to grow, and optimal growth usually occurs at much higher concentrations, typically 20–30% (3.4 - 5.2 mol/L of NaCl).  However, Haloarchaea can grow up to saturation (about 37% salts). Optimal growth also occurs when pH is neutral or basic and temperatures at 45°C. Some haloarchaea though can grow even when temperatures exceed 50°C.  

Haloarchaea are found mainly in hypersaline lakes and solar salterns. Their high densities in the water often lead to pink or red colourations of the water (the cells possessing high levels of carotenoid pigments, presumably for UV protection). The pigmentation will become enhanced when oxygen levels are low due to an increase in a red pigmented ATP.  Some of them live in underground rock salt deposits, including one from middle-late Eocene (38-41 million years ago). Some even older ones from more than 250 million years ago have been reported. Haloarchaea is also used to treat water that is high in salinity. This is due to its ability to withstand high nutrient levels and the heavy metals that may be present.

Adaptations to environment
Haloarchaea can grow at an aw close to 0.75, yet a water activity (aw) lower than 0.90 is inhibitory to most microbes. The number of solutes causes osmotic stress on microbes, which can cause cell lysis, unfolding of proteins and inactivation of enzymes when there is a large enough imbalance. Haloarchaea combat this by retaining compatible solutes such as potassium chloride (KCl) in their intracellular space to allow them to balance osmotic pressure. Retaining these salts is referred to as the “salt-in” method where the cell accumulates a high internal concentration of potassium. Because of the elevated potassium levels, haloarchaea have specialized proteins that have a highly negative surface charge to tolerate high potassium concentrations.

Haloarchaea have adapted to use glycerol as a carbon and energy source in catabolic processes, which is often present in high salt environments due to Dunaliella species that produce glycerol in large quantities.

Phototrophy

Bacteriorhodopsin is used to absorb light, which provides energy to transport protons (H+) across the cellular membrane. The concentration gradient generated from this process can then be used to synthesize ATP. Many haloarchaea also possess related pigments, including halorhodopsin, which pumps chloride ions in the cell in response to photons, creating a voltage gradient and assisting in the production of energy from light. The process is unrelated to other forms of photosynthesis involving electron transport, however, and haloarchaea are incapable of fixing carbon from carbon dioxide. Early evolution of retinal proteins has been proposed as the purple Earth hypothesis.

Cellular shapes
Haloarchaea are often considered pleomorphic, or able to take on a range of shapes—even within a single species. This makes identification by microscopic means difficult, and it is now more common to use gene sequencing techniques for identification instead.

One of the more unusually shaped Haloarchaea is the "Square Haloarchaeon of Walsby". It was classified in 2004 using a very low nutrition solution to allow growth along with a high salt concentration, square in shape and extremely thin (like a postage stamp). This shape is probably only permitted by the high osmolarity of the water, permitting cell shapes that would be difficult, if not impossible, under other conditions.

As exophiles
Haloarchaea have been proposed as a kind of life that could live on Mars; since the Martian atmosphere has a pressure below the triple point of water, freshwater species would have no habitat on the Martian surface. The presence of high salt concentrations in water lowers its freezing point, in theory allowing for halophiles to exist in saltwater on Mars. Recently, haloarchaea was sent 36 km (about 22 miles) up into Earths atmosphere, within a balloon. The two types that were sent up were able to survive the freezing temperatures and high radiation levels.  This only further extends the theory that halophiles could exist on Mars.

Medical use 
Certain types of haloarchaea have been found to produce carotenoids, which normally has to be synthesized using chemicals. With haloarchaea naturally producing it, there is now a natural way to synthesize carotenoids for medical use.  Haloarchaea has also been proposed to help meet the high demand of carotenoids by pharmaceutical companies due to how easy it can be grown in a lab. Genes in Haloarchaea can also be manipulated in order to produce various strands of carotenoids, further helping meet pharmaceutical companies needs.

Haloarchaea is also present within the human gut, mostly predominant in the gut of people who live in Korea. Haloarchaea are most abundant in Koreans guts rather than methanogens due to their saltier diets. This also shows that the archaeome in the human gut can vary drastically depending on region and what is eaten.

Climate change 
Haloarchaea have been proposed that certain types can be used to make biodegradable plastics, which could help decrease plastic pollution. Haloarchaea are able to produce polyhydroxyalkanote (PHA), polyhydroxybutyrate (PHB) and polyhydroxyvalerate (PHV), when exposed to certain conditions. For large scale production of these bioplastics, haloarchaea is favored due to the low cost, fast growth, and lack of need to sterilize area due to the salty environment they prefer. They are also a cleaner option for bioplastics due to them not needing chemicals for cell lysis  and have a higher recyclability of the process. 

Certain types of haloarchaea have also been found to poses denitrifying characteristics. If haloarchaea are complete denitrifies, they could aid salt marsh and other salty environments by buffering these areas of nitrate and nitrite. This could help animal diversity and decrease pollution with in these waterways. However, when tested in the lab, haloarchaea have been found to be partial denitrifies. This means that if haloarchaea are used to treat areas that are high in nitrite and nitrate, they could contribute to nitrogen contaminates and cause an increase in ozone depletion, furthering climate change. The only type of haloarchaea that has been found to reduce nitrogen pollution to atmospheric nitrogen has been Haloferax mediterranei.  This shows that haloarchaea may be contributing to nitrogen pollution and isn't a suitable solution to reducing nitrate and nitrite within high salinity areas.

See also 
 Life on Mars
 Purple Earth hypothesis
 List of Archaea genera

References

Further reading

Journals

Books

Databases

External links 

An educational website on haloarchaea
HaloArchaea.com
Mike Dyall-Smith's Homepage

Halophiles
Euryarchaeota
 
Archaea classes